Ion Panţuru (11 September 1934 – 17 January 2016) was a Romanian bobsledder. He competed in two-man and four-man events at the 1964, 1968, 1972 and 1976 Olympics and served as the Olympic flag bearer for Romania in 1964 and 1972.

Panţuru took up bobsleigh at the age of 24, after playing as a football goalkeeper at the Divizia B-level. At the 1968 Games he won a bronze medal with brakeman Nicolae Neagoe, which remains Romania's only medal at the Winter Olympics. At the same Olympics he was also close to a bronze medal in the four-man competition, placing fourth. At the FIBT World Championships he won two medals in the two-man event, together with another brakeman Dumitru Focșeneanu, with a silver in 1969 and a bronze in 1973. At the European championships Panţuru won four-man gold medals in 1967 and 1971, placing second in four-man in 1968–69 and in two-man events in 1967 and 1969; he also won a four-man bronze medal in 1970.

Panţuru lost his 1969 World Championships medal in a car on his way to the airport. The medal was found in a basement 30 years later, and returned to Panțuru. After retiring from competitions he worked as a national bobsleigh coach. For his sports achievements he was made an honorary citizen of three Romanian towns: Comarnic, Sinaia and Busteni.

References

External links

1972 bobsleigh four-man results
Bobsleigh two-man Olympic medalists 1932–56 and since 1964
Bobsleigh two-man world championship medalists since 1931
DatabaseOlympics.com profile

1934 births
2016 deaths
People from Comarnic
Romanian male bobsledders
Olympic bobsledders of Romania
Bobsledders at the 1964 Winter Olympics
Bobsledders at the 1968 Winter Olympics
Bobsledders at the 1972 Winter Olympics
Bobsledders at the 1976 Winter Olympics
Olympic bronze medalists for Romania
Olympic medalists in bobsleigh
Medalists at the 1968 Winter Olympics